Bogoslovka is a rural locality (a selo) and the administrative center of Bogoslovsky Selsoviet of Mazanovsky District, Amur Oblast, Russia. The population was 235 as of 2018. There are 4 streets.

Geography 
Kozlovka is the nearest rural locality.

References 

Rural localities in Mazanovsky District